Events from the year 1820 in Canada.

Incumbents
Monarch: George III (died January 29), George IV (starting January 29)

Federal government
Parliament of Lower Canada: 9th (until February 9) then 10th (April 11 – April 24) then 11th (starting December 14)
Parliament of Upper Canada: 7th (until March 7)

Governors
Governor of the Canadas: Robert Milnes
Governor of New Brunswick: George Stracey Smyth
Governor of Nova Scotia: John Coape Sherbrooke
Commodore-Governor of Newfoundland: Richard Goodwin Keats
Governor of Prince Edward Island: Charles Douglass Smith

Events
 June 18 – The Governor, Earl of Dalhousie, arrives.

Full date unknown
 Creation of the municipality of Prescott and Russell in Upper Canada (today Ontario).
 William Lyon Mackenzie emigrates to Canada.

Births

January 17 – Hiram Blanchard, Premier of Nova Scotia (d.1874)
February 17 – Elzéar-Alexandre Taschereau, Archbishop of Quebec (d.1898)
May 12 – Luc Letellier de St-Just, politician and 3rd Lieutenant Governor of Quebec (d. 1881) 
May 30 – Pierre-Joseph-Olivier Chauveau, Premier of Quebec (d.1890)

July 2 – Oliver Mowat, politician, 3rd Premier of Ontario and 8th Lieutenant Governor of Ontario (d.1903)
August 2 – John Rose, politician (d.1888)
August 6 – Donald Alexander Smith, politician (d.1914) 
August 16 – Andrew Rainsford Wetmore, Premier of New Brunswick (d. 1892)
August 27 – Charles-René-Léonidas d'Irumberry de Salaberry, militia officer (d.1882)
October 13 – John William Dawson, geologist and university administrator (d.1899)
December 24 – Joseph-Charles Taché, a Canadian noted for his contributions to many aspects of the fabric of Canada (d.1894)

Deaths
 March 12 – Sir Alexander Mackenzie, explorer (b.1764)
 April 8 – Thomas Douglas, 5th Earl of Selkirk, colonizer and author (b.1771) 
 July 11 – Frederick Traugott Pursh, botanist (b.1774)

References 

 
Canada
Years of the 19th century in Canada
1820 in North America